Ciarán Kelly (born 14 March 1980), is an Irish former professional footballer and head coach for Lusail SC in Qatar who played as a goalkeeper. He last played football for Sligo Rovers in the League of Ireland Premier Division until 2013.

Early life
He was born and went to primary school in Roundfort, a small parish near Ballinrobe in South Mayo.

Career
Kelly started his career with Ballinrobe Town before first moving to Sligo Rovers.  He then had spells with Derry City, Athlone Town and Galway United before re-joining Sligo Rovers in 2009.

On 14 November 2010 in the FAI Ford Cup final, Kelly saved four out of four penalties in a penalty shoot-out as Sligo beat Shamrock Rovers 2-0.
On 6 November 2011 in the FAI Ford Cup final, Kelly saved two penalties in a penalty shoot-out as Sligo beat Shelbourne 4-1 after being sprung from the bench at the end of extra time.

Honours
Sligo Rovers
League of Ireland (1): 2012
FAI Cup (3): 2010, 2011, 2013
League of Ireland Cup (1): 2010

References

External links

 

Living people
1980 births
People from Castlebar
Association football goalkeepers
Sligo Rovers F.C. players
Galway United F.C. (1937–2011) players
Athlone Town A.F.C. players
Derry City F.C. players
League of Ireland players
Association footballers from County Mayo
Republic of Ireland association footballers
People educated at St Gerald's College, Castlebar